Tribal is the fourth studio album by the Irish rockabilly musician Imelda May, released on 25 April 2014 on Decca Records.

Originally slated for a summer release, Tribal was recorded at Livingston Studios in London with producer Mike Crossey. The album features a more uptempo style of rockabilly in comparison to May's previous releases, with several critics drawing comparisons to the psychobilly punk band the Cramps and artists such as the B-52s. The album was supported by two singles: "It's Good to Be Alive" and "Wild Woman".

Upon its release, Tribal received generally favourable acclaim and placed in several international charts—including Ireland, where it debuted at number 1; the United Kingdom, where it peaked at number 3; and New Zealand, where it placed in the top 20.

Release
Tribal was announced for release in early 2014. In the original announcement the album was planned for release in June 2014, although the official date was moved forward and Tribal was released on 25 April on Decca Records. The album was made available on CD, LP and as a digital download. Tribal is due to be released in the United States on 23 September on Verve Records.

Two singles were released from Tribal. Its lead single, "It's Good to Be Alive", was released on 1 March 2014; the song had debuted prior to its official release when May performed it on the Tonight Show with Jay Leno in November 2013. The album's second supporting single, "Wild Woman", was released on 18 April 2014.

Reception

Upon its release, Tribal received largely positive acclaim from critics. At Metacritic, which assigns a normalised rating out of 100 to reviews from mainstream critics, the album received an average score of 71, based on 11 reviews, indicating "generally favourable reviews". AllMusic writer Matt Collar awarded Tribal three-and-a-half out of five stars and referred to the album as her "call to arms; her statement of purpose", comparing it to material by Bow Wow Wow, the Cramps and the B-52s. Writing for the Guardian, Caroline Sullivan said that "in May's hands, rockabilly is a feral form, vitally alive and compelling" and surmised that "[Tribal] is no time capsule; it's fresh and bracing" in her four out of five star review. In a three-star review for the Independent, Andy Gill noted that on Tribal May is "still indulging the boisterous rapscallion character suggested by titles like 'Wild Woman', 'Hellfire Club' and 'Gypsy In Me'", adding that "there's sweetness to balance the earthier aspects". Hot Press rated the album three-and-a-half out of five stars.

The Irish Times reviewer Tony Clayton-Lea describe the Tribal as "an astute mix of signature creative riffs … blending film noir-like theme songs with burning and emotive torch ballads", rating the album four out of five stars. Phil Mongredien of the Observer was more critical towards the album writing in his review that although "May [is] an engaging and entertaining storyteller on the more breakneck material", her performance on the album's ballads and low-tempo tracks "are less distinguished" and "more delicate than memorable". He awarded the album three out of five stars. PopMatters writer Steve Horowitz said in a seven out of ten review that May "ferociously attacks the lyrics" on Tribal, "growling and stuttering as needed to reveal the urgency exploding inside of her. Meanwhile, the guitars swirl and the drums pound to create the whirlwind in which May operates." Rating the album four of five in State, Graham Mooney concluded that "with Tribal, Imelda May continues to impress and surprise in equal measure" and referred to the album as "the strongest collection of songs [she] has assembled to date."

Track listing

Personnel
All personnel credits adapted from Tribals album notes.

The Imelda May Band
Imelda May
Darrel Higham
Al Gare
Steve Rushton
Dave Priseman

Technical personnel
Mike Crossey – production, programming
Imelda May – production
Jonathan Gilmore – engineering
Graham Dominey – engineering
Guy Davie – mastering

Design personnel
Stylorouge – art direction, design
Barry McCall – photography
Rob O'Connor – photography

Chart positions

References

External links

2014 albums
Decca Records albums
Imelda May albums